Frederick Lee Davis (February 15, 1918 – March 10, 1995) was an American football defensive lineman in the National Football League (NFL) who played for the Washington Redskins and the Chicago Bears.  A native of Louisville, Kentucky, Davis played college football at the University of Alabama and was drafted in the third round of the 1941 NFL Draft.

External links
 

1918 births
1995 deaths
Alabama Crimson Tide football players
American football defensive linemen
Chicago Bears players
Players of American football from Louisville, Kentucky
Washington Redskins players
Western Conference Pro Bowl players